Časlav is a Slavic given name, which has several spelling variants: Časlav (Cyrillic: Часлав) in Serbian, Čáslav or Čéslav in Czech, and Czasław or Czesław in Polish. In medieval Greek texts, the name is spelled as Τζασθλάβος. The name consists of two elements, ča and slav. The element ča is a Slavic root meaning "to await" or "to look forward to", expressing the idea that the child is an eagerly awaited gift. The element slav is very common in Slavic anthroponyms. It comes from slava "glory", and has the sense of "good name" in the given names.

Notable people named Časlav:
Časlav Klonimirović, ruler of Serbia (927–960)
Časlav Đorđević, Serbian writer

See also
Czesław
Čáslav (disambiguation)

References

Slavic masculine given names
Serbian masculine given names